Sivayya is a 1998 Indian Telugu action drama film directed by Suresh Varma. The film stars Rajasekhar, Sanghavi, Monica Bedi and Srihari. The film was released on 27 March 1998. It was later dubbed in Tamil as Thalaiva. It was also remade in Hindi as Aaghaaz. In Kannada as Dandanayaka Starring Devaraj.

Plot 
A villager, Sivayya goes to the city for the sake of his sister's education. The friendly neighborhood sweet shop owner has a daughter Sirisha, who promptly falls in love with Sivayya impressed by our hero's muscular features. Now the local market is under the control of the evil Jyothi and his equally evil brother Poorna. Sivayya clashes with them and attempts to terminate their terror. But thanks to a backstabbing friend, his cause is doubted. And in the midst of much mindless violence, which leaves our Sivayya half-dead, his sister is raped by these rowdies. Roja is a police inspector who previously had an affair with Sivayya's. Sivayya married his father's friend's daughter for the sake of father's death promise. During pregnancy she misunderstood Sivayya and Roja's relationship. Finally she understands Sivvayya. She dies in an accident. After the flashback, Roja helps Sivayya to fight against Poorna.

Cast

 Rajasekhar as Sivayya
 Monica Bedi as Inspector Roja
 Sanghavi as Sirisha
 Srihari
 Ravi Babu
 Raja Ravindra
 Chitti Babu
 Rajitha
 Narasimha Raju
 Mohan Raj
 Chalapathi Rao
 Giri Babu
 Krishnaveni
 Bangalore Padma
 Rama Prabha
 Amanchi Venkata Subrahmanyam
 Jaya Prakash Reddy
 Gundu Hanumantha Rao
 Shiva Parvathi

Awards
The film won Nandi Award for Best Male Dubbing Artist - A. Srinivasa Murthy

Soundtrack
The film score and the soundtrack were composed by M. M. Srilekha. The soundtrack, released in 1998, features five tracks with lyrics written by C. Narayana Reddy, Jonnavittula Ramalingeswara Rao and Chandrabose.

References 

1998 films
1990s Telugu-language films
1990s action drama films
Indian action drama films
Films scored by M. M. Srilekha
Films produced by D. Ramanaidu
Telugu films remade in other languages